Edd, or EDD may refer to:

Fictional characters
 Dolorous Edd, a character from A Song of Ice and Fire and its adaptation, Game of Thrones
 Edd (Ed, Edd n Eddy), a character of the Ed, Edd n Eddy cartoon
 Edd the Duck, a puppet

People
 Edd Byrnes (1932–2020), born Edward Byrne Breitenberger, American actor
 Edd China (born 1971), motor specialist and TV personality
 Edd Gould (1988–2012), creator of Eddsworld
 Edd Hall (born 1958), announcer on The Tonight Show
 Edd Kalehoff (born 1946), composer and musician
 Edd Kimber, winner of the first series of The Great British Bake Off 
 Edd Roush (1893–1988), baseball player
 Elena Delle Donne (born 1989), American basketball player

Science and medicine
 Electron-detachment dissociation, a method for fragmenting anionic species in mass spectrometry
 Emotional Dysregulation Disorder, or borderline personality disorder
 End-diastolic dimension, a property of the heart 
 Expected Date of Delivery, the estimated date when a woman will give birth
 Experimental design diagram, a diagram used in science classrooms to design an experiment

Technology
 Earliest due date, a heuristic used for machine scheduling
 Electronic Direct Democracy, in e-democracy
 Element Definition Document, style and formatting information for displaying FrameMaker documents
 Enhanced Disk Drive, information provided by a computer BIOS to the operating system
 Ethernet Demarcation Device, A device that provides separation between a carrier's network and the customer's network, see Carrier Ethernet demarcation

Other uses 
 Ecological Debt Day, the calculated illustrative calendar date on which humanity’s resource consumption for the year exceeds Earth’s capacity to regenerate those resources that year
 Ed.D., Doctor of Education or Doctor in Education
 Edd, Eritrea, a town in the Southern Red Sea Region of Eritrea
 Employment Development Department, an agency of the state of California
 English Dialect Dictionary, a dictionary compiled by Joseph Wright
 Enhanced due diligence, an advanced standard process of a business verifying the identity of its clients to assess potential financial risks
 Eth (Ð ð), (Faroese: edd) a letter used in Old English, Middle English, Icelandic and Faroese
 Europe of Democracies and Diversities, a former political group in the European Parliament

See also
 Ed (disambiguation)